Woodspring was a constituency represented in the House of Commons of the Parliament of the United Kingdom from 1983 until 2010. It elected one Member of Parliament (MP) by the first past the post system of election. From 1992 until 2010, it was represented by Liam Fox, former Secretary of State for Defence. Fox went on to represent the new North Somerset constituency from 2010.

Boundaries 
1983–1997: The District of Woodspring wards of Backwell, Clevedon Central, Clevedon East, Clevedon North, Clevedon South, Clevedon Walton, Clevedon West, Easton-in-Gordano, Gordano, Long Ashton, Nailsea East, Nailsea North and West, North Weston, Portishead Central, Portishead Coast, Portishead South, Portishead West, Winford, and Wraxall, and the District of Wansdyke wards of Cameley, Chew Magna, Chew Stoke, Clutton, Compton Dando, Farmborough, Harptrees, High Littleton, Paulton, Publow, Stowey Sutton, and Timsbury.

1997–2010: The District of Woodspring wards of Backwell, Clevedon Central, Clevedon East, Clevedon North, Clevedon South, Clevedon Walton, Clevedon West, Easton-in-Gordano, Gordano, Long Ashton, Nailsea East, Nailsea North and West, North Weston, Portishead Central, Portishead Coast, Portishead South, Portishead West, Winford, Wraxall, Wrington, and Yatton.

The constituency contained the northern and eastern parts of the North Somerset unitary authority (formerly the Woodspring district of the County of Avon, and roughly the same area as the ancient Hundred of Portbury).  The constituency extended between two rivers with the Avon running along the north-east edge and the Congresbury Yeo to the south. It included the three main towns of Clevedon on the west coast, Nailsea to the south, and Portishead to the north, along with smaller surrounding villages like Backwell, Easton-in-Gordano, and Long Ashton.

Boundary review

Following the review of parliamentary representation by the Boundary Commission for England in North Somerset which took effect at the 2010 general election, this seat was renamed North Somerset.

History
On its creation in 1983, Woodspring was won by the Conservative Sir Paul Dean, who had held the old seat of Somerset North since 1964. Sir Paul was a Deputy Speaker of the House to George Thomas and latterly Bernard Weatherill from 1982 to 1992; he served longer than anyone else since the post was created in 1902. On his retirement in 1992 Liam Fox succeeded him, and held the seat until its abolition in 2010; during this time he served as a junior minister in the Major government, and later became an opposition frontbencher during the Blair and Brown governments.

Members of Parliament

Elections

Elections in the 2000s

Elections in the 1990s

Elections in the 1980s

See also 
 List of parliamentary constituencies in Avon

Notes and references 

Parliamentary constituencies in Somerset (historic)
Constituencies of the Parliament of the United Kingdom established in 1983
Constituencies of the Parliament of the United Kingdom disestablished in 2010